Abrahaminte Santhathikal (: Descendants of Abraham) is an Indian Malayalam-language action thriller film, released in 2018, directed by debutant Shaji Padoor and written by Haneef Adeni. The film stars Mammootty and Anson Paul in the lead roles, and Kaniha, Tarushi, Renji Panicker, Yog Japee and Kalabhavan Shajon in pivotal roles. Shot in Ernakulam, principal photography began on 5 January 2018 and ended in March. Gopi Sundar scores music to the film and editing is handled by Mahesh Narayan.

The film was released on 16 June 2018.

Plot
A series of 9 murders occur. ASP Derick Abraham figures out that the serial killer is a hard-line Christian extremist using the killer's note, and those being targeted are atheists. He captures the killer: Brother Simon of the local seminary. Simon tells him that he will definitely reach his target of 10 people. When Derick leaves and comes back, Simon is found dead with a slash on his throat and a knife in his hand. Derick assumes he committed suicide, becoming the tenth victim. Derick is suspended because of this. Later he gets reinstated into the force also. Derick's family consists of only his younger brother Philip Abraham, who is training as a sharp shooter. Their parents died in a car accident when they were young. Philip is later accused of killing his girlfriend Aleena while drunk, and is severely beaten up by Derick's senior officer, Narayana Sethupathi. 

Derick is forced to arrest Philip as the evidence is against him. Philip pleads that he's innocent and has been trapped. Unable to cope with his brother's arrest, Derick becomes a drunkard. Meanwhile, at the prison, Phillip starts to hate him and vows to kill Derick once he's released. Dinesh, the jail warden learns of this and tells him he can assist with the escape to settle his personal score with Derick. The latter had once arrested Dinesh's and Narayana's sons in a kidnapping case. Narayana's son kills himself before being arrested, so these two have a grudge against Derick. Philip, with the help of Dinesh and Narayana, later escapes prison. Philip's close friend Nisam meets Derick and discloses the events that occurred on the night of Aleena's murder. Philip was with Nisam and two of his other friends, Arun and Salman at night where Philip was intoxicated and fell asleep. 

Aleena called to meet him at the beach but Arun answered the phone and reached the place with the others instead. They accidentally kill her in the process. On realizing this, Derick wants to convince the police department that Phillip is innocent. However, the next day Nisam kills himself. Philip attempts to kill Derick in a supermarket but fails. Derick finds Arun and Salman at a car wash and tells them to surrender but they refuse and fight him instead. Derick's ex-girlfriend, Diana's child, is kidnapped and despite her hatred towards Derick, is forced to seek his help and Derick accepts. The kidnappers are shown to reach the place and take the money but they don't release the kid. 

The police follow and catch them, but on inquiring they learn that they were paid to be the decoy. CI Sukumaran, who is Derick's subordinate and close friend, tells Diana, Dinesh, Narayana and SP Shahul Hameed, the head of the investigation, that all this is part of a plan by Derick and Philip. It was their plan to escape prison in the first place, make the others believe that there was hatred between them and kill Arun and Salman: the real culprits. He also tells them that Derick had killed Arun and Salman by shooting them at point blank.
Derick wanted to get Philip out of the country for his safety and secure his life, with the help of Issac, so the ransom amount was used for this purpose. However, all this was done without leaving any evidence. Derick emotionally bids farewell to Phillip as he leaves. At the police station, DYSP Johnny mocks Derick for his suspension three years ago. However, it's revealed that Derick actually killed Brother Simon and cleared up the evidence.

Cast 
 
 Mammootty as ASP Derick Abraham IPS
 Anson Paul as Philip Abraham
 Kanika as Adv. Diana Joseph
 Tarushi Jha as Aleena Maria Jacob
 Renji Panicker as SP Shahul Hameed IPS
 Yog Japee as Narayana Sethupathi
 Siddique as Dinesh
 Kalabhavan Shajon as CI Sukumaran
 Suresh Krishna as DYSP Johnny
 Sudev Nair as Brother Simon
 Maqbool Salmaan as Arun
 Shyamaprasad as Isaac IPS, RAW
 Spadikam George as Jacob
 Janardhanan as Priest
 I. M. Vijayan as DYSP Muhammed Jalal
Sijoy Varghese as Joseph Esthappan
 Jayakrishnan as Joseph
 Sohan Seenulal as SI Varghese
 Mukundan as Father, School Principal
 Baiju V. K. as Joy
 Master George
 Adhil Unais Hussain
 Retheesh Krishnan
 Anoop Vijay as Nisam
 Gilu Jose as Mariya Joseph
 Bindu Delhi as Mrs. Sethupathi

Production 
Produced under Goodwill Entertainments, Abrahaminte Santhathikal was announced on 7 September 2017 by producer Joby George on Mammootty's birthday. It is the directorial debut of Shaji Padoor, an associate director in Malayalam cinema for 22 years, and is scripted by Haneef Adeni. In fact, Mammootty had been asking Shaji to direct a film for over 15 years and had given an open date. Mammootty plays an IPS officer named Derrick Abraham in the film. Shaji said that the plot revolves around an investigation but it is not a dark thriller, and the protagonist appears uniformed in one or two shots only. The other cast and crew had not been finalised as of January.

By December end, Anson Paul, Kaniha, Siddique, Renji Panicker, Suresh Krishna and Tamil actor Yog Japee were confirmed. With a puja event in Kochi on 1 January 2018, cinematographer Alby, editor Mahesh Narayan, composer Gopi Sundar and make-up artist Ronex Xavier joined the crew. At the event, Mammootty introduced his and Anson Paul's roles as "Abraham's two children". Anson and Ratheesh Krishnan, who plays a throughout role, were also Mammootty's suggestions in the cast. Principal photography started on 5 January 2018 in Kolenchery, Eranakulam. Mammootty was shot on that day at a house at Choondy. Kaniha chose it since a Mammootty film and joined in January second week, playing a public prosecutor. Tarushi who plays Anson's love interest was shot for 10 days. Filming ended by mid-March.

Release
The movie was released on 16 June 2018 in Kerala. It was released in Gulf countries on 21 June and in the rest of India the following day. The Times of India and International Business Times gave the film positive reviews.

Box office
The film collected 41 lakhs from US box office in its four weeks. The film grossed $860,055 from UAE box office in six weeks. It grossed a total of 40 crore worldwide at the end of its theatrical run.

Soundtrack
Gopi Sundar composed the film score and two songs; Christian devotional "Yerusalem Nayaka" video song was released in May. All the lyrics are penned by Rafeeq Ahamed.

References

External links 

 

2010s Malayalam-language films
2018 action thriller films
2018 directorial debut films
2018 films
Films about police officers
Films scored by Gopi Sundar
Indian action thriller films